Hugh Nelson may refer to:
Hugh Nelson (Australian politician) (1833–1906), Premier of Queensland, Australia
Hugh Nelson (American politician) (1768–1836), U.S. Representative from Virginia
Hugh Nelson (Canadian politician) (1830–1893), Canadian politician
Hugh Nelson (priest) (born 1972), British Anglican priest and bishop-designate of St Germans